The most important power stations in Turkey are listed here. Turkey generates about 300 TWh of electricity per year.

High Carbon Emissions

Coal

All operational coal-fired power stations over 50MW are listed below.

Five plants were shut down at the end of 2019 to reduce air pollution, leaving total installed capacity at about 17 GW, with 1.3 GW under construction. However government may continue subsidizing some of the most polluting plants in 2020. In 2019 almost 500 million lira was paid to them.

In 2017 imported hard coal generated 51 TWh and local coal (almost all lignite) 44 TWh of electricity.

Hard coal is estimated to emit 1126 g CO2-eq./kWh and lignite 1062 g CO2-eq./kWh.

Medium Carbon Emissions

Natural Gas

In 2020 about 68 TWh of electricity was generated from gas. , according to the head of the Electricity Producers’ Association, natural gas plants do not have enough money for maintenance work.

Geothermal
The CO2 emissions from new geothermal plants in Turkey are high but gradually decline: lifecycle emissions are still being researched as of 2019.

Low carbon emissions

Hydroelectric

Solar photovoltaic
 there is 9 GW of solar PV.

Solar thermal

Wind
As of 2022, there were 280 wind farms in Turkey, of which 280 were active in production with a total installed capacity of 10.592 GW more than 10% of the total installed power capacity of the country.

Nuclear

See also 

 List of power stations in Asia
 List of power stations in Europe
 List of largest power stations in the world
 Hydroelectricity in Turkey
 Wind power in Turkey

Notes

External links
 Turkey and coal on Global Energy Monitor
 Map of European coal plants including Turkey

References

Sources

Turkey
Lists of buildings and structures in Turkey